Nagpur Improvement Trust (NIT) is a local civic government body with the task of developing new areas within the city limits of Nagpur, India and maintaining existing city infrastructure. This trust works along with Nagpur Municipal Corporation (NMC) which is an elected body of city representatives (Corporation). NIT itself is not a democratically elected civic body and has members appointed in it from various levels like Government of Maharashtra, NMC and other representatives of Nagpur. NIT thus has a small management body as compared to NMC. NIT holds the planning and development authority for Nagpur but does not receive any funds from state government. Funds needed for development work are raised by NIT through the auction of newly developed areas.

Overview

NIT has played a major role in the expansion and maintaining Nagpur in its past 65+ years of work. However, the existence of NIT alongside NMC has been criticized several times as a violation of constitution of India. Several Chief Ministers of Maharashtra and former Governor of Maharashtra tried to abolish this agency but did not succeed. The argument is that the Constitution of India allows only democratically elected bodies to carry out the work of civic administration. Since NIT is not such a body, it has been demanded by several political bodies to abolish the NIT Act of 1936 or to merge NIT with NMC. It has been claimed that due to political reasons state government has failed to take any action till now. However, there are similar organizations like the Mumbai Metropolitan and Area Development Authority (MMRDA), Delhi Development Authority (DDA) and several such agencies that are functioning in the country today and the argument of NIT not fulfilling constitutional requirements has not been substantiated in the courts of law. NIT has also faced criticism from those farmers which had to hand over their lands as per NIT directives and the Urban land ceiling act.

History
Nagpur is an important city in central India and during days of British Raj two separate committees were formed to look after city's development. The Nagpur Municipal Committee was established in 1864. The Civil Station Sub-Committee was established in 1884. In 1928, the Municipal Committee passed a resolution for creating an "Improvement Trust" for Nagpur which was established in 1937 under the Nagpur Improvement Trust Act, 1936. NIT began functioning in 1937 and has collateral jurisdiction over the areas within the limits of the town wherever schemes are prepared by the trust and approved by the government.

After Indian independence, the Town Planning Department was established in 1947 under Central Provinces and Berar State Town Planning Expert with head office at Nagpur. The Department functioned under the administrative control of the local Self-Government Department. The Central Provinces and Berar Town Planning Act was enacted in 1948 and the Central Provinces and Berar Regulation of Uses of Land Act was also enacted in the same year to provide for the making and execution of town planning schemes and to regulate the development of areas with the object of securing proper sanitary conditions, amenities and convenience to persons living in such areas and in neighboring areas.

Later with creation of Maharashtra, Nagpur became part of Maharashtra. A new branch office of this department came into existence at Nagpur for the four districts of Nagpur, Chandrapur, Wardha and Bhandara. The Nagpur department continued to function along with NMC.

Organization 
NIT board members include -
 A Chairman, who is a senior Indian Administrative Service (IAS) officer (currently Dr.Deepak Mhaisekar )
 Commissioner of Nagpur Municipal Corporation.
 Deputy Director of Town Planning for Nagpur Division.
 Chairman of Standing Committee.
 One Corporation elected by NMC.
 A member of the Maharashtra Legislative Assembly who is a resident of Nagpur.
 Three members appointed by the State Government of Maharashtra.

Work 
Nagpur Improvement Trust has played a major role in transforming Nagpur into a mega city. Its major responsibilities include - housing schemes, rebuilding of certain city pockets, maintaining city streets, drainage, sanitation, and other city improvement schemes.

The NIT act of 1936 allows NIT to acquire land from surrounding rural areas to develop into new urban layouts. Money needed to acquire these lands and develop them is recovered back by the auction to general public when they are ready. Once a new area of the city is developed by NIT it is handed back to NMC for maintenance. NMC then recovers the money in form of various taxes from the residents of which two percent is given back to NIT. NIT in turn has the responsibility to provide drinking water and sewage disposal for these areas. NIT also distributes significant land acquired to weaker sections of the society at considerably lower rates. NIT also undertakes the work of regularization of unauthorized residential zones. NIT is also responsible for maintaining the 8 major gardens and 40 mini gardens in Nagpur. Various lakes and city monuments that come under the jurisdiction of local bodies are maintained by NIT. It has recently started a project to rejuvenate the Futala Lake in the city. NIT is also working on rejuvenating the Indira Gandhi Government Medical College, Nagpur on a Build-Operate-Transfer basis.

In 2007, NIT unveiled the plans for setting up the Nagpur Metropolitan Region Development Authority (NMRDA). NIT was given the status of development authority by the state government and it has identified a total area of 3780 km2 for the Greater Nagpur Metropolitan Area excluding the area under NMC limits. The first phase of this Nagpur Metropolitan Region is to cover 1,520 km2 of area. NIT is also planning to build a monorail in Nagpur. Maharashtra Airport Development Company (MADC) which is currently building MIHAN in Nagpur has also shown keen interest in the project.

References 

Government of Nagpur
State urban development authorities of India
Organizations established in 1937
1937 establishments in India